Wamsley, Ohio is an unincorporated community in Ohio, US.

Wamsley may also refer to:

 Gary Wamsley, American public administration specialist and professor
 John Wamsley, Australian environmentalist
 Rick Wamsley, Canadian professional ice hockey goaltender
 Wamsley Creek, a stream in Missouri (USA)
 33681 Wamsley, a minor planet

See also
 Murder of Rick and Suzanna Wamsley
 Other C. Wamsley House, historic octagon house in Hamilton, Montana (USA)